The Ministry for Europe and Foreign Affairs is a department of the Albanian Government, in charge of diplomacy, foreign policy and the process of admission of Albania into the European Union. The ministry also provides support to Albanian citizens residing abroad. In September 2017, the ministry was restructured and it was merged with the Ministry of European Integration.

History

Establishment
The establishment of the Ministry of Foreign Affairs (MFA) of the modern Albanian state dates back to the creation of the Provisional Government of Vlora on December 4, 1912, a few days after declaring Albania's secession from the Ottoman Empire. The Prime Minister of the Provisional Government, Ismail Qemali, also held the post of Minister of Foreign Affairs until June 1913. Later this function passed to Myfit Bey Libohova who exercised it until the end of January 1914. The MFA in this period functioned as a section of the Provisional Government, with the main objective ensuring the recognition of Albania's independence from the Great Powers at the London Conference of Ambassadors. To accomplish this goal were also accomplished the first diplomatic services as was the diplomatic deployment of the Government of Vlora at the Ambassadorial Conference, headed by the personal diplomat of the Prime Minister, which was Rasih Dino.

1914–1920

On March 7, 1914, the German prince Wilhelm Friedrich Heinrich arrives in Durrës. The Prince of Albania appointed on 17 March 1914 the "definitive government". The first Prime Minister and Minister of Foreign Affairs of the newly recognized Albanian state was Turhan Pashë Përmeti, former ambassador of the Ottoman Empire in Saint Petersburg. Turhan Pasha remained foreign minister until May 28, 1914, later replaced by Prenk Bib Doda and the latter, after July, was followed by Mehmet Konica.

Since Italy and Austria-Hungary were the authors of the formula for recognition of Albania's independence, Captain Castoldi, an Italian officer, was "commanded" at the Ministry of Foreign Affairs for diplomatic missions. He and the Austrian diplomat Carl Buchberger formed the prince's political cabinet. The first official Albanian diplomatic representation was established in Vienna, represented by Syrja bey Vlora, and in Rome, represented by Myfid bej Libohova. The government and the Ministry of Foreign Affairs of Albania operated until the eve of the First World War in September 1914. On September 3, Prince William of Wied left Albania and the country turned into a theater of war in the Balkan states and the Great Powers.

1920–1925

In January 1920, in Lushnje, at the initiative of Albanian patriots and intellectuals of the time, a Congress was convened with representatives from all the liberated provinces of Albania, which would elect Albanian national government away from Italian influences. On January 30, 1920, the Albanian national government was created, with a broad support base.

Its prime minister was Sulejman Delvina and Minister of Foreign Affairs Mehmet Konica. Since the Peace Conference in Paris left unresolved recognition of the independence and borders of Albania, as set forth in 1913, Foreign Minister Konica immediately embarked on the key European chancellors of the time to secure their support in reaching a decision-making for Albania. To build a foreign professional service, with a special decision of the Council of Ministers, in October 1920, the Minister of Foreign Affairs, M.Konica, was asked to find a consul from the old Austrian consuls to be hired for a 2-year period for organizing Albanian consulates and serving as teachers for those who wanted to enter the consular service of Albania. Then, in August 1921, the National Council (parliament), upon the proposal of the Foreign Policy Committee, decided to open the Albanian consulates in Brindisi, Trieste and Florence.

Officeholders (1912–present)

Notes

See also
 Foreign relations of Albania

References

Politics of Albania
Foreign Affairs
1912 establishments in Albania
Albania